The East Wing of the White House is a two-story structure that serves as office space for the First Lady and her staff, including the White House social secretary, White House Graphics and Calligraphy Office and correspondence staff.  The East Wing also includes the visitors' entrance and the East Colonnade, a corridor connecting the body of the East Wing to the residence. Along the corridor is the White House theater, also called the Family theater. Social and touring visitors to the White House usually enter through the East Wing. The East Wing was built on top of the Presidential Emergency Operations Center, a secure emergency underground shelter for the President.

Visitors touring the White House enter through the wood-paneled lobby, where portraits of presidents and first ladies hang. They go through the Garden Room and along the East Colonnade, which has a view of the Jacqueline Kennedy Garden, past the theater to the Visitors' Foyer. They enter the residence at the ground floor.

History
President Thomas Jefferson added colonnaded terraces to the east and west sides of the White House, but no actual wings. Under Jackson in 1834, running water was piped in from a spring and pumped up into the east terrace in metal tubes. These ran through the walls and protruded into the rooms, controlled by spigots. Initially, the water was for washing items, but soon the first bathing rooms were created, in the ground-level east colonnade. Van Buren had shower baths installed here. The East Terrace was removed in 1866. For many years, a greenhouse occupied the east grounds of the White House.

The first small East Wing was built during the Theodore Roosevelt renovations, as an entrance for formal and public visitors. This served mainly as an entrance for guests during large social gatherings, when it was necessary to accommodate many cars and carriages. Its primary feature was the long cloak room with spots for coats and hats of the ladies and gentlemen.

The East Wing as it exists today was added to the White House in 1942 primarily to cover the construction of an underground bunker, now known as the Presidential Emergency Operations Center (PEOC). Around the same time, Theodore Roosevelt's coatroom became the movie theater. Later, offices for correspondence, calligraphers and the social secretary were placed in the East Wing. Eleanor Roosevelt employed the first social secretary.

Rosalynn Carter, in 1977, was the first First Lady to keep her own office in the East Wing. Today, the social secretary prepares all of the invitations and written correspondence for every event held at the White House.

References

External links
 The White House Web site
 White House Museum: East Wing, with floorplan and historical images

White House
White House Executive Residence Operations